Sanahin is a village in the northern province of Lori in Armenia, now considered part of the city of Alaverdi (a cable car connects it with Alaverdi). The village is notable for its Sanahin Monastery complex, founded in the 10th century and listed as a UNESCO  World Heritage Site, along with the nearby Haghpat Monastery.

Notable people
Sanahin was also the birthplace of the two well-known Mikoyan brothers. Artem Mikoyan was a well-known airplane constructor, and one of the "fathers" of MiG. Anastas Mikoyan was the politician with the longest career of any member of the Soviet Politburo. He was involved in negotiating the Molotov–Ribbentrop Pact, was a member of the Soviet delegation trying to improve relations with Josip Broz Tito's Yugoslavia, and played a major role in the Cuban Missile Crisis negotiations. A fraction of visitors to the monastery also stop at the small nearby Mikoyan museum in the former school, run by Mikoyans' relatives.

References

 

Populated places in Lori Province